Christian Anuforo (1938 – August 1966)  was a Nigerian Army major and one of the principal plotters of the January 15, 1966 coup, an event that derailed Nigeria's nascent democracy and introduced military rule to Nigeria.

Education
Anuforo attended Saint John's College in Kaduna, where he became close friends with Kaduna Nzeogwu. He received his commission in 1961 from the Royal Military Academy, Sandhurst.

Participation in the January 15, 1966 coup
While serving as the Staff Officer at Army Headquarters, Anuforo along with other Majors (Kaduna Nzeogwu, Emmanuel Ifeajuna, Adewale Ademoyega, Don Okafor, Humphrey Chukwuka, and Timothy Onwuatuegwu plotted the overthrow of Abubakar Tafawa Balewa's government for what the conspirators perceived as the government's corrupt management of Nigeria.

Anuforo was reportedly the most ruthless of the January 15 conspirators and according to the Nigerian Police Special Branch investigation of the coup, Anuforo executed Lt Colonels James Pam, Arthur Unegbe, Colonel Kur Mohammed and Federal Minister of Finance Festus Okotie-Eboh.

Death
In August 1966 some troops (of northern origin) from the 4th battalion at Ibadan, after attending a funeral in Benin, learned that Anuforo and other January 15 conspirators were in the Benin prison. The 4th battalion troops then broke into Benin prison to exact revenge for what they perceived as an ethnic based January 15, 1966 coup that had many northern casualties. Anuforo and other soldiers in detention such as warrant officers James Ogbu and B. Okuge, Sergeants Chukwu, Ogbuhara, and Ndukife, were tortured and killed.

References

Igbo Army personnel
Nigerian Army officers
Participants in the January 1966 Nigerian military coup
Graduates of the Royal Military Academy Sandhurst
1966 deaths
1938 births